Horace Cumberland Disston (January 7, 1906 – September 30, 1982) was an American field hockey player who competed in the 1932 Summer Olympics and 1936 Summer Olympics.

He was born in Philadelphia, Pennsylvania and died in Camden, Maine.

In 1932 he was a member of the American field hockey team, which won the bronze medal. He played two matches as halfback.

Four years later he was a member of the American field hockey team, which lost all three matches in the preliminary round and did not advance. He played three matches as halfback.

See also
List of Princeton University Olympians

External links
 
profile

1906 births
1982 deaths
American male field hockey players
Field hockey players at the 1932 Summer Olympics
Field hockey players at the 1936 Summer Olympics
Olympic bronze medalists for the United States in field hockey
Field hockey players from Philadelphia
Medalists at the 1932 Summer Olympics
20th-century American people